Polo Community High School (simply referred to as Polo High School) is a public high school in Polo, Illinois, United States. It is part of the Polo Community Unit School District No. 222.

It was ranked as the 6,869 best school in the United States, 218 in Illinois, and 4th in the Rochelle metro area based on U.S. News & World Report 2019 ranking.

Athletics 
The Marcos compete in the Northwest Upstate Illini Conference and participate in several Illinois High School Association (IHSA) sponsored athletics and activities, including; eight-man football, girls volleyball, boys and girls basketball, baseball, softball, cross country, competitive cheer, and music. Additionally, they co-op with Forreston High School for wrestling and boys and girls track and field, and Byron High School for girls and boys swimming and diving.

References

External links 
 

Public high schools in Illinois
Schools in Ogle County, Illinois